Esen (1407–1454), was a powerful Oirat taishi and the de facto ruler of the Northern Yuan dynasty between 12 September 1453 and 1454. He is best known for capturing the Emperor Yingzong of Ming in 1450 in the Battle of Tumu Fortress and briefly reuniting the Mongol tribes. The Four Oirat reached the peak of their power under his rule.

Name 
Esen means "good health" in Mongolian. Taishi is derived from the Chinese title 太師 (tàishī), meaning Grand Preceptor. Among Mongol tribes, this title was used for powerful nobles who were not part of the Chinggisid lineage.

In Chinese, Esen is rendered as 也先 (Yěxiān) or less commonly as 額森 (Ésēn).

Youth and early career

Esen was born to his father, Toghan, the Choros taishi who had expanded Oirat territory substantially, with more Mongol tribes acknowledging his supremacy. As an Oirat, Esen himself was not descended from Genghis Khan, which would hamper his claim to the title of great khan throughout his life.

In his early campaigns he fought against the Chaghatayid khans of Moghulistan. Esen three times defeated and twice captured the Moghul ruler Uwais Khan (Ways Khan, 1418–1432). Esen released him out of respect for his Chinggisid blood in both cases. The third time, Uwais Khan granted Esen his sister Makhtum Khanim, who bore his two sons. Esen nominally converted to Islam in order to marry the Muslim princess, but remained effectively a shamanist.

After his father died in 1438, Esen inherited his position, taishi, for the reigning khan Taisun Khan (reigned 1433–52). Under Esen Taishi's leadership, the Mongols under Taisun Khan unified the North Yuan, including the Jurchens and Tuvans in Manchuria and Siberia. In the 1430s, Esen also took over control of the Mongol kingdom known as Kara Del in the Hami oasis between the Gobi and the Takla Makan deserts. After 1443–45 the Northern Yuan reached Korea.

Conflict with Ming dynasty

Background 
Esen entered into conflict with the Ming dynasty. The Ming dynasty had for some time pursued a "divide and rule" strategy in dealings with their northern neighbors, maintaining trade relationships, functioning as a kind of state-subsidized monopoly, with multiple leaders who they could then turn against one another by inciting jealousy or suggesting intrigue. However, a unified Northern Yuan was less susceptible to such tactics. Many of the tribes brought under Oirat dominion had inhabited areas claimed by the Ming, and other tribes had been pushed south into Ming territory seeking to escape Oirat subjugation. The Chagatayid Hami oasis, furthermore, had paid tribute to the emperor before Esen convinced its ruler to pay tribute to the Oirats instead. Throughout the 1440s, Esen increased both the frequency of tribute missions to the Ming and the number of representatives sent on each mission. According to surviving Chinese accounts, the Oirats asked for more and more lucrative tribute and trade agreements.

The Ming tried to stir rivalry between Taisun Khan, but Esen chose "rivals" below him in status to counter the divide and rule strategy. So the Ming resorted to another strategy: to buy off the Northern Yuan with gifts.

Esen encouraged hundreds of Mongol, Hami, and Samarkand-based Muslim merchants to accompany his missions to the Ming Emperor. Beginning in 1439 Taisun Khan and Esen sent envoys to the Ming, often numbering more than 1,000. They asked for more and more gifts. In response to this inflation of numbers, the Emperor Yingzong of Ming (1427–64) decreased trade with Esen and Taisun Khan, and closed border trade with the Northern Yuan.

Capture of the Emperor Yingzong of Ming 
In retaliation for these trade sanctions, Esen Taishi led an invasion of the Ming Empire in 1449 that culminated in the capture of the Ming emperor during the Tumu Crisis. The large-scale, three-pronged invasion began in July, with Taisun Khan leading the easternmost force to Liaodong, the grand councillor Alag attacking Xuanfu, and Esen himself leading the troops that sacked Datong in August. Another column of the Mongols invaded Ganzhou.

The campaign was a massive victory for the Northern Yuan, with the Mongols crushing Zhu Qizhen's forces. Even though Zhu's troops in the region are estimated to have numbered as many as 500,000, Zhu was still crushed by Esen Taishi's 20,000 cavalry. Datong lay next to the south side of the Great Wall of China. After the initial attack on Datong, Esen pretended to retreat back into the Mongolian steppes. The emperor and his hastily raised army chased the invaders west and met an ambush upon arriving at Datong. Mongol horsemen harried Zhu's retreat back towards the wall for four days while hampered by thunderstorms. The imperial army eventually reached the Tumu Fortress. However, rather than having secured a defensible position, Zhu's troops were trapped against the northern side of the fortress, and the Northern Yuan horsemen annihilated Zhu's army.
Most of the remaining soldiers were slaughtered. Esen was still some distance away, near Xianfu. Six weeks later, when the captured emperor Zhu Qizhen was brought to his camp, Esen attempted to ransom the emperor back to the Ming. According to some accounts, it was at this point that Esen was granted the title "Taishi."

In any case, the Ming refused to negotiate a ransom, perhaps in part because the emperor's brother (prince Zhu Qiyu, later the Jingtai Emperor) was by then installed on the throne and not eager to give up his new position. Yu Qian (于謙), the defense minister of Ming, who was organizing the counterstrike, commented that the emperor's life is not as important as the fate of the country. He also believed that ransoming the emperor might boost the Northern Yuan's morale and reduce that of the Ming.

Beijing

Esen still considered the emperor more valuable alive than dead. Esen then laid siege to Beijing, but it failed.

Esen offered the emperor his sister in marriage (Heqin), but the emperor rejected Esen. The Ming Beijing garrison led by Yu Qian soon turned the situation around. Yu Qian ordered his forces to pretend that they had lost control of the city gate in order to lure Mongol horsemen into the city. Once a large portion of the Mongol force was inside, the gate was shut and the Mongols were ambushed. Esen's sworn blood brother was killed in the attack. Having failed to take the city, Esen was forced to retreat under pressure from his own troops and by the arrival of Ming reinforcements.

Esen and Taisun Khan turned to attack Manchuria and East Siberia, under Ming rule, around the Nen River and Songhua River, but failed and were defeated by the Ming.

Negotiations
The Ming court elevated the Jingtai Emperor (reigned 1449–57) to the throne. Esen sent the captured emperor back in 1450. Since the Mongol economy relied on their trade with the Ming dynasty, Esen was obligated to reopen negotiations, now under a much weaker position. While Ming-Mongol trade did not cease entirely during the Tumu Crisis, Esen had not only failed to win better terms than the prior arrangements, he was forced to accept less favorable terms in return for resumption of trade with the Ming. The Northern Yuan then entered a vassal relationship with the Ming for some time.

Reign and death
Taisun Khan and Esen Taishi quarreled over the heir to the throne. Esen wanted a son of his sister to be the successor of Taisun Khan, but Taisun nominated a son of his eastern Mongol khatun instead, leading to a war between the factions. Agbarjin jinong, who was married to Esen's daughter Tsetseg, was promised the new title of khan and deserted to the Oirats. Taisun, supported by the Ming dynasty's Three Guards, openly led his own forces against Esen and Agbarjin in 1451, but they were outnumbered and the khan was eventually killed in 1452 while attempting to flee. Esen wasn't satisfied with this victory alone, and later murdered Agbarjin and his Borjigin heirs at a feast, with the intention of becoming khan himself. Tsetseg was pregnant at the time, and Esen promised to kill the baby if it was male, but Samur Gunj helped the infant prince escape when he was born. This prince would grow up to be Bayan-Mongke, the father of Dayan Khan. In 1453, eighteen months after his defeat of Taisun Khan, Esen himself took the title of “Tian-sheng Khagan of the Great Yuan” (大元天盛大可汗 Tengri Bogd Khan). At the same time, the Oirats launched an invasion against Moghulistan, Tashkent, and Transoxiana.

The Ming emperor was among the first to acknowledge the new title, but the reaction of Esen's fellow Mongols, Oirat and otherwise, mostly ranged from disapproving to enraged. Though Esen's lineage was related to the royal line descended from Temüjin (Genghis Khan) through his grandmother Samur Gunj (princess), it was unlikely that he would have been considered eligible for election as Khan, and in any case, Esen ignored the usual selection process. Rather than the title of khan falling automatically to the eldest eligible male of the line, as in primogeniture, Mongol leaders were traditionally chosen by means of the kurultai, an elective monarchy system, with members of the lineage voting to choose the title's successor from among themselves. This dissatisfaction soon escalated into open revolt against Esen.

Esen gave his son Amasanj the title of taishi, an action which led Alag, his powerful general and leader of the Baatud, into rebellion as he had expected to be awarded the title himself. Other Oirat leaders joined the rebellion against Esen, and he was defeated in battle and murdered in 1454, a year after his assumption of the title of khan. After his death, the Oirats no longer held sway over eastern Mongolia, which had come under their control through Esen and his father's influence. The eastern and western Mongols remained divided for the centuries to come. The 17th and 18th century Zunghar rulers considered themselves to be descendants of Esen Taishi.

See also
 List of khans of the Northern Yuan dynasty
 Four Oirat
 Tumu Crisis
 Kara Del

References

Citations

Sources 

 
 Twitchett, Denis, Frederick W. Mote, & John K. Fairbank (eds.) (1998). The Cambridge History of China: Volume 8, the Ming Dynasty, Part 2, 1368–1644. Cambridge University Press. pp. 233–239. . Google Print. Retrieved 2 November 2005.
 Mancini, Robert David (publication year unknown). "Dharma Daishi, Great Teacher of Buddhism and the Martial Arts".
 van der Kuijp, Leonard W.J. (1993). "Jambhala: an imperial envoy to Tibet during the late Yuan". The Journal of the American Oriental Society 113 (4), 538–?

1455 deaths
Northern Yuan rulers
Oirats
15th-century Mongol rulers
15th-century Chinese monarchs
Year of birth unknown